The Action Office is a series of furniture designed by Robert Propst, and manufactured and marketed by Herman Miller. First introduced in 1964 as the Action Office I product line, then superseded by the Action Office II series, it is an influential design in the history of "contract furniture" (office furniture). The Action Office II series introduced the concept of the flexible, semi-enclosed workspaces, now better known as the cubicle. All cubicle office designs can be traced back to Herman Miller's Action Office product lines.

History
In 1960 Herman Miller created the Herman Miller Research Corporation, placing the new organization under the supervision of George Nelson, with day-to-day activities directed by Robert Propst. Although Nelson remained at Herman Miller's main campus in Zeeland, Michigan, Propst and the Herman Miller Research Corporation were located in Ann Arbor, Michigan (placing it in close proximity to the University of Michigan campus). Herman Miller Research Corporation's mission was not to address problems with furniture itself, but to solve problems related to the use of furniture. The corporation's first major project was an evaluation of "the office" as it had evolved during the 20th century — particularly how it functioned in the 1960s. Propst's studies included learning about the ways people work in an office, how information travels, and how the office layout affects their performance. He consulted with Joan Evans (scholar of ornament and pattern), Terry Allen and Carl Frost (Michigan State University psychologists), Robert Sommer (who investigated the effects of different spaces on mental health), Edward T. Hall (anthropologist and author of the 1959 book, The Silent Language), as well as with a number of specialists, including mathematicians and behavioral psychologists.

Propst concluded from his studies that during the 20th century, the office environment had changed substantially, especially when considering the dramatic increase in the amount of information being processed. Despite the change in what an employee had to analyze, organize, and maintain on a daily basis, the basic layout of the corporate office had remained largely unchanged, with employees sitting behind rows of traditional desks in a large open room that was devoid of privacy. Propst's studies suggested that an open environment actually reduced communication between employees, and impeded personal initiative. On this, Propst commented that "one of the regrettable conditions of present day offices is the tendency to provide a formula kind of sameness for everyone." In addition, the employees' bodies were suffering from long hours of sitting in one position. Propst concluded that office workers require both privacy and interaction, depending on which of their many duties they were performing.

Action Office I
Propst and the Herman Miller Research Corporation formulated a plan to address the problems plaguing office workers of the time, which George Nelson's team realized in the form of the Action Office I. It was introduced in the Herman Miller lineup in 1964.  Action Office I featured desks and workspaces of varying height that allowed the worker freedom of movement, and the flexibility to assume the work position best suited for the task. Action Office I was ideally suited to small professional offices in which managers and employees often interacted using the same furnishings. However, Action Office I was expensive, difficult to assemble, and was not suitable for offices at large corporations. Despite the shortcomings of Action Office I, Nelson won the Alcoa Award for the product's design, neglecting to mention Propst's contribution.

Action Office II
Following the poor sales of Action Office I, Propst and Nelson went back to the drawing board, and sought to create the next-generation, Action Office II. For several years Propst and Nelson fought over what kind of work environment they believed would best suit a corporate office worker. Unable to come to an agreement, Nelson was eventually taken off the project. With Nelson gone, Propst was free to explore his concept of an office that was capable of frequent modification to suit the changing needs of the employee, without having to purchase new furnishings. He wanted to allow the employee a degree of privacy, and the ability to personalize their work environment without impacting the environment of the workers around them. Propst recognized that people are more productive within a territorial enclave that they can personalize, but also require vistas outside their space. His concept was the "back-up," a two or three sided vertical division that defined territory and afforded privacy without hindering the ability to view or participate in happenings outside the space.

Action Office II was based around the mobile wall unit that defines space. The unit also supported multiple workstation furnishings that benefited from the vertically oriented work space. The components were interchangeable, standardized, and simple to assemble and install. More importantly, they were highly flexible, allowing the company to modify the work environment as needs changed.

The Action Office II lineup was an unprecedented success, often referred to as the birth of the modern cubicle, and was quickly copied by other manufacturers.

Despite the Action Office II line becoming Herman Miller's most successful project, George Nelson distanced himself from any connection with the project. In 1970, he sent a letter to Robert Blaich, who had become Herman Miller's Vice-President for Corporate Design and Communication, in which he described the system's "dehumanizing effect as a working environment." He summed up his feeling by saying:

One does not have to be an especially perceptive critic to realize that AO-II is definitely not a system which produces an environment gratifying for people in general. But it is admirable for planners looking for ways of cramming in a maximum number of bodies, for "employees" (as against individuals), for "personnel," corporate zombies, the walking dead, the silent majority. A large market.

Scornful as he may have been, Nelson was correct in stating that there would be a "larger market" for Action Office II. By 2005 total sales had reached $5 billion.

Coherent Structures
Propst's last contribution to the Action Office lineup was a series of furnishings designed specifically for the hospital and laboratory setting. Known as Coherent Structures, the series of highly mobile containers, frames, carts, storage devices, and rails were introduced in 1971. Designed to streamline the service functions of a hospital environment, they were highly successful until the advent of centralized computer systems made such portability of physical documents obsolete.

Ethospace
Designed by Jack Kelley, who worked on the design of both Action Office I and Action Office II, Ethospace enhanced the wall elements of the Action Office II system. Kelley changed the wall units to highly varied — but standardized — tiles that could simply slide into a frame and be finished with end caps. By selecting new Ethospace tiles, one could quickly change the color, texture, function, and character of the workspace without dismantling the frame or disrupting work.

First installations
The first offices to incorporate Action Office products were in the Federal Reserve Bank of New York, which had contracted with George Nelson and Herman Miller in 1963 to design an innovative office space that could maximize efficiency in a small area. The resulting design was based on Nelson's CPS (Comprehensive Panel System), and featured "pods" of four cubicles arranged in a swastika pattern, each with an L-shaped desk and overhead storage. Surviving photos of the Federal Reserve Bank offices reveal a design that would not appear much different from a cubicle of today.

In 1964 this design was re-used for the Woman's Medical Clinic of Lafayette, Indiana, and in Nelson's own New York design offices.

Action Office today
The Action Office I series was dropped from the Herman Miller lineup in 1970.  In 1978 the Action Office II line was renamed simply Action Office.  Herman Miller describes it as "the world's first open plan office system," and claims a $5 billion installed base.

In 1985 the Worldwidedesign Congress named Action Office the "Most Significant Design since 1960".

Recent modifications to Action Office include increased storage and more collaborative workspaces. The New York Museum of Modern Art added Resolve, a 1999 design that incorporates technology and 120° corners, to the museum's permanent collection in 2001.

In 1997, Robert Propst said that he had hoped that his idea would "give knowledge workers a more flexible, fluid environment than the rat-maze boxes of offices," but regretted that his idea had evolved to some extent into just that, saying that "the cubicle-izing of people in modern corporations is monolithic insanity."

In the media
Action Office furnishings have appeared in many films released within the last thirty years. The first film to feature Action Office products was Stanley Kubrick's 2001: A Space Odyssey, released in 1968. In the film a white Action Office I roll-top desk is used in the space station reception area.

See also
 Office landscape
 Office space planning
 Systems furniture

References

External links
 D. J. DePree of the Herman Miller Company
 

History of furniture